Gilbert Mathon (born 7 May 1941 in Vitry-en-Artois) is a member of the National Assembly of France.  He represents the Somme department,  and is a member of the Socialiste, radical, citoyen et divers gauche.

References

1941 births
Living people
People from Pas-de-Calais
Politicians from Hauts-de-France
Socialist Party (France) politicians
Deputies of the 13th National Assembly of the French Fifth Republic